William Louis Veeck Sr. (January 20, 1876 – October 5, 1933) was an American sportswriter and baseball executive. He was president of the Chicago Cubs from 1919 to his death in October, 1933. Under Veeck's leadership, the Cubs won two pennants, in 1929, and 1932.

Veeck was a Chicago American sportswriter working under the pseudonym Bill Bailey before Cubs owner William Wrigley Jr. hired him to be vice-president of the baseball club in 1917. Having won the National League pennant in 1918, Wrigley promoted him to president of the club in July, 1919. Under Veeck's watch, Wrigley Field began taking on its present look, with ivy-colored outfield walls and concrete bleachers in the outfield. Veeck was also the father of Bill Veeck, who is best known for his time at the reins of the Chicago White Sox and Cleveland Indians, and for sending the midget Eddie Gaedel to bat while owning the St. Louis Browns. The ivy-covered walls were actually Bill Jr.'s idea. 

Veeck resided in the Chicago suburb of Hinsdale, Illinois. He married Grace Greenwood DeForest in 1900, who died in 1964. They had three children: Maurice, who died at age 8; Margaret Ann Veeck Krehbiel, and William Louis Veeck Jr., also known as Bill Veeck.

Veeck Sr. is buried at the Bronswood Cemetery in Oak Brook, IL.

References

Other sources
Bill Veeck: Baseball genius
Jack Bales, "Wrigley Jr. & Veeck Sr." WrigleyIvy.com.
Jack Bales, "Baseball's First Bill Veeck," The Baseball Research Journal 42, no. 2 (Fall 2013): 7–16.
Jack Bales, "'It Was His Fairness That Caught Wrigley’s Eye': William L. Veeck’s Journalism Career and His Hiring by the Chicago Cubs,” Nine: A Journal of Baseball History and Culture 20, no. 2 (Spring 2012): 1–14.

Chicago Cubs executives
1876 births
1933 deaths